Spaced Invaders is a 1990 American science fiction comedy directed by Patrick Read Johnson and starring Douglas Barr, Royal Dano, and Ariana Richards.

The film’s title is a pun on the classic video game Space Invaders.

Plot
The space armada from Mars fights an interstellar war against their long-time enemy, the Arcturans. The Martian armada is sent into battle by Enforcer Drones, tasked to keep the Martian soldiers in line, despite objections by some that it won't work. Meanwhile, the incompetent crew of a small spaceship from the Martian "Civilian Asteroid Patrol" intercepts a distress signal from the fleet. Said signal is followed by a Halloween rebroadcast of Orson Welles' 1938 The War of the Worlds radio dramatization.

Mistaking this for a real invasion—and not wanting to miss out on the glory of "kicking some Earthling butt"—the CAP crew lands their ship in the tiny community of Big Bean, Illinois; there they proceed with their "invasion" of the planet. The ship's smart-mouthed pilot Blaznee, who has more common sense than the others, doesn't think it's a good idea. He is ignored by the rest of the crew: Captain Bipto, an overzealous optimist; Lieutenant Giggywig, an ambitious and hot-headed know-it-all; Dr. Ziplock, the careful and calculating science officer; and the alternately-overeager-and-timid Corporal Pez. The CAP crew searches for the (nonexistent) Martian invasion fleet which they believe has already landed. Because it's Halloween, everyone assumes the Martians are kids in exceptionally-well-made costumes. Eventually, though, a few locals realize the truth. Among them is the town sheriff (Barr), his daughter Kathy (Richards), and an elderly farmer named Wrenchmuller (Royal Dano), on whose farm the Martians have crash-landed. The sheriff finds out about the aliens when his deputy records their ship doing 3,000 mph.

The deputy tracks down the ship in order to give the occupants tickets for having no license, registration, headlights, taillight, or wheels, and going 2,945 miles over the posted limit. Kathy discovers the aliens when they join a group of trick-or-treating kids. She befriends the Martians' "Scout-in-a-Can", a small robot which folds up into a sphere. Mr. Wrenchmuller tries to cash in on the Martians' existence in order to save his farm. Captain Bipto gets hit by a truck and turns a gas station attendant named Vern into his robotic slave. Giggywig, Ziplock, and Pez try to blow up the town's Co-Op and instead just heat up a silo of corn kernels, creating a gigantic hot-air popcorn-popper. Kathy's new friend, a boy named Brian, captures Blaznee by hitting him with a trashcan lid. He then tries to help the alien repair his ship. Attempting to blow the ship up, Wrenchmuller is trapped in a paralyzing beam. The desperate Martians try to blow the Earth up using the D.O.D. (Doughnut Of Destruction), but it falls apart instead. The Martians finally realize they made a horrible mistake.

Things get worse when the ship's "hyperdriver" goes into meltdown, threatening to create a black-hole. Their ship's Enforcer Drone won't let them leave, making things even more complicated. The humans succeed in destroying the Enforcer Drone with dynamite, then offer to help the grateful "invaders" return to space. As an unintentional gift, the Martians jettison their ship's sewage tank while flying over Wrenchmuller's field.

The alien excrement rejuvenates the drought-stricken farmland while turning the regular green beans (for which the town is famous) into gigantic, 6-foot-tall pods; this enables Wrenchmuller to save the town from greedy real-estate developers. As the Martians head home, Captain Bipto suggests they go to Arcturus to "help torture prisoners"; this idea is promptly vetoed by the rest of the crew.

Reception
Film historian Leonard Maltin gave the movie 1.5 out of 4 stars, declaring it "Criminally overlong...It all makes you wonder why Orson Welles couldn't get financing for decades, while pictures like this one are produced by the truckload." The film has gained a cult following.

Cast
Douglas Barr as Sheriff Sam Hoxly
Royal Dano as Mr. Wrenchmuller
Ariana Richards as Kathy Hoxly
Gregg Berger as Steve W. Klembecker
Fred Applegate as Deputy Russell Pillsbury
Wayne Alexander as Vern Pillsbury / Verndroid
J.J. Anderson as Brian Hampton
Patrika Darbo as Mrs. Vanderspool
Tonya Lee Williams as Ernestine Hampton
Kevin Thompson as Blaznee
Jimmy Briscoe as Captain Bipto
Tony Cox as Corporal Pez
Debbie Lee Carrington as Dr. Ziplock
Tommy Madden as Lieutenant Giggywig

Voices
Kevin Thompson as Blaznee
Jeff Winkless as Captain Bipto
Tony Pope as Corporal Pez
Joe Alaskey as Dr. Ziplock
Bruce Lanoil as Lieutenant Giggywig
Patrick Read Johnson as Commander / Enforcer Drone
Kirk Thatcher as Shortstuff

TV series
In November 1997, a live-action TV series was being developed by Gullane Entertainment

References

External links

Fiction set around Arcturus
Mars in film
Alien invasions in films
1990s science fiction comedy films
American science fiction comedy films
Touchstone Pictures films
1990 films
American space adventure films
Films directed by Patrick Read Johnson
American films about Halloween
1990 directorial debut films
1990 comedy films
1990s English-language films
Films about father–daughter relationships
1990s American films